Piribedil (trade names Pronoran, Trivastal Retard, Trastal, Trivastan, Clarium and others) is an antiparkinsonian agent and piperazine derivative which acts as a D2 and D3 receptor agonist. It also has α2-adrenergic antagonist properties.

Medical uses
 Treatment of Parkinson's disease (PD), either as monotherapy (without levodopa)) or in combination with L-DOPA therapy, in the early stages of the disease as well as in the advanced ones
 Treatment of pathological cognitive deficits in the elderly (impaired attention, motivation, memory, etc.)
 Treatment of dizziness in the young patients
 Treatment of retinal ischemic manifestations
 Adjunctive treatment of intermittent claudication due to peripheral vascular disease (PVD) of the lower limbs (stage 2)
 Adjunctive treatment of anhedonia and treatment-resistant depression in unipolar and bipolar depressives (off label)
 Treatment of gait disorders associated with Parkinson's disease (no related cause) and other forms of parkinsonism

Other uses
The drug has been shown to enhance working memory capacities in normal aging adults.

In age-related memory impairment, it has a positive effect on psychophysiological state of elderly people, improving memory and attention and increasing the velocity of psychomotor reactions and lability of nervous processes.

It enhances cognitive skill learning in healthy older adults.

It showed a positive effect in restless legs syndrome.

Dosage

Parkinson's disease
Administration of piribedil should be initiated with one sustained-release tablet (50 mg) daily during the first week. Dosage should then be gradually increased every week until achieving the optimal therapeutic dose:

 As monotherapy: three to five tablets in three to five doses daily.
 In combination with L-DOPA therapy: one to three tablets daily.

Other indications
One tablet daily at the end of the main meal. In severe cases: two tablets daily in two doses.

Side effects
 Minor gastrointestinal upset (nausea, vomiting, flatulence, etc.) in predisposed individuals, or when taken between meals: adjust dosage individually, and/or add domperidone;
 Orthostatic hypotension or drowsiness may occur, particularly in predisposed individuals (underlying condition or causative illness);
 Mild dizziness, confusion and feeling "drunk" also may occur.

As with other dopamine agonists (like pramipexole and ropinirole), compulsive behavior like pathological gambling, overeating, excessive shopping, increased libido, sexual and/or other intense urges, may develop.

Another rare side effect of piribedil is excessive daytime sleepiness and unintended sleep episodes.

Overdose
At very high doses, piribedil has an emetic action on the chemoreceptor trigger zone (CTZ). Tablets will thus be rapidly rejected, which explains why no data are currently available concerning the risk of overdosage.

Interactions
Dopamine antagonists reduce the effect of piribedil.

Pharmacology

Pharmacodynamics
 Dopamine receptor agonist, selective for subtypes D2 and D3.
 Dopamine receptor antagonist, selective for subtypes D4.
 Adrenergic receptor antagonist, subtypes α2A and α2C: could be the reason why piribedil seems to cause less drowsiness than other dopamine agonists.
 Lack of affinity to serotonin receptor 5-HT2B: theoretically no risk of heart valve impairment.

Synthesis
Parkinson's patent:

2-Chloropyrimidine [1722-12-9] (1) and 1-Piperonylpiperazine [32231-06-4] (2) give Piribedil (3). Alternately, 2-(1-Piperazinyl)pyrimidine [20980-22-7] (4) can be reacted with Piperonyl bromide [2606-51-1] (5).

References

External links
 

Alpha-2 blockers
Aminopyrimidines
Benzodioxoles
Dopamine agonists
Piperazines